Transformers is a franchise centered on shapeshifting alien robots.

Transformers or The Transformers may also refer to:

Film and television

 Transformers (film comic series)
 The Transformers: The Movie, a 1986 animated film associated with the series
 The Transformers (TV series), a 1984–1987 American animated television series
 Transformers (film series)
Transformers (film), a 2007 live-action film

Video games

 The Transformers (1986 video game), a game for the Sinclair Spectrum and Commodore 64 computers
 Transformers (2003 video game), a video game
 Transformers (2004 video game), a video game based on Transformers: Armada

Comics
 Transformers (comics)
 Transformers (2019 comic book)
 The Transformers (IDW Publishing)
 The Transformers (Marvel Comics)

Music
 The Transformers The Movie: Original Motion Picture Soundtrack, the 1987 film's soundtrack
 Transformers: The Album, the 2007 film's soundtrack
 Transformers: The Score, the 2007 film's musical score

Other uses
 Transformers (board game), a 1986 board game
 Transformers (toy line), a line of toys produced by Hasbro
 Transformers: The Ride 3D, theme park rides located in several Universal Studios parks

See also
 Transformer (disambiguation)
 Transformers: Dark of the Moon (disambiguation)
 Transformers: Revenge of the Fallen (disambiguation)
 Transformers: Robots in Disguise (disambiguation)